Pelican Lake is a lake in Grant County and Douglas counties, in the U.S. state of Minnesota.

Pelican Lake was named for the pelicans frequently seen at the lake by early settlers.

See also
List of lakes in Minnesota

References

Lakes of Minnesota
Lakes of Douglas County, Minnesota
Lakes of Grant County, Minnesota